Selin Sivrikaya (born January 1, 1997) is a Turkish women's football midfielder currently playing in the First League for Kireçburnu Spor with jersey number 7. She was a member of the Turkey women's U-19 team.

Early life
Selin Sivrikaya was born to Bekir Sivrikaya and his wife Hülya in Akhisar town of Manisa Province on January 1, 1997. She was schooled in her hometown, and graduated from Akhisar Zeynep Gülin Öngör Vocational High School for Girls.

During her high school years, she played futsal and helped to her school team's achievement as becoming the champion of Manisa Province League and of the regional league.

Career

Club

She obtained her license on March 9, 2012, for Karşıyaka BESEM Spor in İzmir, which competed in the Turkish Women's Second League. Sivrikaya played two seasons for her club and scored 45 golas in 19 matches. At the end of the 2013–14 season, she enjoyed her team's promotion to the Women's First League.

However, she transferred in January 2015 for the second-half season to 1207 Antalya Muratpaşa Belediye Spor, which played in the Second League. Sivrikaya enjoyed a second time the promotion of her team to the First League, this time with 1207 Antalya Muratpaşa Belediye Spor. In the 2015–16 season, she played in the Women's First League. The next season, Sivrikaya transferred to the Istanbul-based club Kireçburnu Spor.

International
Selin Sivrikaya was admitted to the Turkey girls' U-17 team and debuted in the International Women's Under-17 Tournament against Slovenia on June 22, 2013, and already scored two goals in her first international appearance. She took part at the 2014 UEFA Women's Under-17 Championship qualification – Group 4 matches. She played in nine matches of the Turkey girls' U-17 team  and scored thirteen goals until 2014. She ranks on second place of the all-time top goalscorers list.

On November 26, 2013, Sivrikaya appeared for the first time with the Turkey women's U-19 team in the friendly game against Azerbaijan. She played at the UEFA Women's Under-19 Championship qualification matches in 2014, 2015, 2015 Elite round and 2016. She capped 31 times in total and scored seven goals for the Turkey women's U-19 team.

She played once for the Turkey women's U-21 team in the friendly match against Belgium on November 26, 2014.

Career statistics

Honours
 Turkish Women's Second League
 Karşıyaka BESEM Spor
 Runners-up (1): 2013–14
 Third places (1): 2012–13

 1207 Antalyaspor
 Winners (1): 2014–15

References

External links

Living people
1997 births
People from Akhisar
Turkish women's footballers
Women's association football midfielders
Karşıyaka BESEM Spor players
1207 Antalya Spor players
Kireçburnu Spor players